Timothy Stapleton (born 1957) is an Irish former hurler. At club level he played with Borris–Ileigh and was also a member of the Tipperary senior hurling team.

Career

Stapleton first played hurling as a schoolboy at Templemore Vocational School while also lining out at juvenile and underage levels with the Borris–Ileigh club. His career with the club's senior team spanned three decades, during which time he won four North Tipperary SHC titles and three Tipperary SHC titles between 1976 and 1988. He was at full-back of the Borris–Ileigh team that beat Rathnure in the 1987 All-Ireland club final.

Stapleton first played for Tipperary during a two-year tenure at minor level. He progressed to the under-21 team and was an unused substitute when Tipperary were beaten by Galway in the 1978 All-Ireland under-21 final. Stapleton was drafted onto the senior team's extended panel in 1980 and served as team captain in 1982.

Honours

Borris–Ileigh
All-Ireland Senior Club Hurling Championship: 1987
Munster Senior Club Hurling Championship: 1986
Tipperary Senior Hurling Championship: 1981, 1983, 1986 
North Tipperary Senior Hurling Championship: 1976, 1981, 1983, 1988

Tipperary
Munster Under-21 Hurling Championship: 1978

References

External link

 Timmy Stapleton player profile

1957 births
Living people
Borris-Ileigh hurlers
Tipperary inter-county hurlers